The Băcișoara is a right tributary of the river Mureș in Romania. It discharges into the Mureș in Ilia.

References

Rivers of Romania
Rivers of Hunedoara County